The Journal of Hand Surgery (American Volume) is a peer-reviewed medical journal that addresses the "diagnosis, treatment, and pathophysiology of diseases and conditions of the upper extremity." The editor-in-chief is Brent Graham. It is published by Elsevier on behalf of the American Society for Surgery of the Hand.

Abstracting and indexing 
The journal is abstracted and indexed in Scopus and the Science Citation Index Expanded. According to the Journal Citation Reports, its 2018 impact factor is 2.09.

References

External links 
 

Elsevier academic journals
English-language journals
Surgery journals